The 10 Big Lies About America: Combating Destructive Distortions About Our Nation is a 2008 book by radio talk show host Michael Medved. The book reached #30 on the New York Times Best Seller List.

Publication history
The 10 Big Lies About America was published on November 18, 2008, by Crown Forum in hardback, and was released October 13, 2009, in paperback.

See also 
Hollywood vs. America
The Fifty Worst Films of All Time
The Golden Turkey Awards
The Hollywood Hall of Shame

References

External links
 After Words interview with Medved on The 10 Big Lies About America, December 6, 2008, C-SPAN

2008 non-fiction books
Anti-Americanism
American non-fiction books
Crown Publishing Group books